Nymphicula drusiusalis is a moth in the family Crambidae. It was described by Francis Walker in 1859. It is found on Borneo.

References

Nymphicula
Moths described in 1859